Natey Adjei (born September 15, 1989) is a former Canadian football wide receiver in the Canadian Football League (CFL) who played in six seasons and was a member of three CFL teams. He played college football at City College of San Francisco and the University at Buffalo and attended St. Joseph Secondary School in Mississauga, Ontario.

Professional career

Toronto Argonauts 
Adjei was drafted with the 22nd overall pick in the 2013 CFL Draft by the Toronto Argonauts. He played his first two seasons with the Argonauts, catching a total of 11 passes for 124 yards and one touchdown.

Edmonton Eskimos 
Adjei was then signed by the Edmonton Eskimos prior to the 2016 CFL season. After catching only six passes in this first two seasons in Edmonton he saw an increased workload in 2018, catching 22 passes for 214 yards and a touchdown. Adjei and the Eskimos agreed to a two-year contract extension on January 24, 2019. He enjoyed a career year in 2019, playing in all 18 regular season games and recording 75 catches for 534 yards and two touchdowns, including one on a career-long reception of 77 yards. He was released by the Eskimos during the ensuing off-season on February 1, 2020.

Toronto Argonauts (II) 
On February 5, 2020, it was announced that Adjei had re-joined the Toronto Argonauts as a free agent. However, he did not play in 2020 due to the cancellation of the 2020 CFL season and he became a free agent in 2021.

Montreal Alouettes 
On February 11, 2021, it was announced that Adjei had been signed by the Montreal Alouettes. However, he retired shortly before the 2021 season began on June 22, 2021.

Natey Adjei finished his career having played in 98 regular season games with 97 receptions for 925 yards and four touchdowns. He also made 33 special teams tackles and eight other tackles.

Sportscasting career 
Following his retirement Adjei joined TSN 1050 to be the radio colour commentator for Argos games, alongside play-by-play announcer Mike Hogan.

References

External links
Montreal Alouettes bio
Buffalo Bulls bio

1989 births
Living people
American football wide receivers
Buffalo Bulls football players
Canadian Football League announcers
Canadian football wide receivers
Canadian people of Ghanaian descent
Canadian players of American football
Canadian radio sportscasters
City College of San Francisco Rams football players
Edmonton Elks players
Montreal Alouettes players
Players of Canadian football from Ontario
Canadian football people from Toronto
Toronto Argonauts players
Black Canadian players of Canadian football